Susan Straight (born October 19, 1960) is an American writer. She was a National Book Award finalist for the novel Highwire Moon in 2001.

Biography

Susan Straight attended John W. North High School in Riverside, California and took classes at Riverside Community College while in high school. She went on to earn a scholarship to the University of Southern California and, in 1984, earned her M.F.A. from the University of Massachusetts Amherst's MFA Program for Poets & Writers.  She co-founded the Master of Fine Arts in Creative Writing & Writing for the Performing Arts program at University of California, Riverside, where she is currently a Distinguished Professor of Creative Writing and the director of the graduate program.

Straight has published eight novels, a novel for young readers and a children's book.  She has also written essays and articles for numerous national publications, including The New York Times, Los Angeles Times, The Nation and Harper's Magazine, and is a frequent contributor to NPR and Salon.com.  Her story "Mines," first published in Zoetrope All Story, was included in Best American Short Stories 2003.

Straight lives in Riverside, California. She has three daughters.

Awards and honors
1990 Milkweed National Fiction Prize for Aquaboogie 
2001 finalist, National Book Award for Fiction for Highwire Moon 
2007 Lannan Literary Award (Fiction)
2008 Edgar Allan Poe Award for short story "The Golden Gopher".
2013 Los Angeles Times Book Prize Robert Kirsch Award.

Bibliography

Novels

I Been in Sorrow's Kitchen and Licked Out All the Pots (1993)
Blacker Than a Thousand Midnights (1995)
The Gettin' Place (1997)
 Highwire Moon (2001) – finalist for the National Book Award
A Million Nightingales (2006)
Take One Candle Light a Room (2010)
Between Heaven and Here (2012)
Mecca (2022)

Short fiction 

"Mines," The Best American Short Stories 2003 (2003)
"Poinciana," The Cocaine Chronicles (2005)
"The Golden Gopher," Los Angeles Noir (2007)
"El Ojo de Agua," The O. Henry Prize Stories 2007 (2007)
"The Princess of Valencia," Amazon Original Stories (2018)
"The Perseids," Granta (2018)

For younger readers 
Bear E. Bear (1995)
The Friskative Dog (2007)

Nonfiction 

 In the Country of Women (2019)

Essays, reporting and other contributions
Race:  An Anthology in the First Person (essay, "Letter to My Daughters") (1997)
Mothers Who Think: Tales of Real-Life Parenthood (essay, "One Drip at a Time") (1999)
When Race Becomes Real: Black and White Writers Confront Their Personal Histories (essay, "Country Music") (2002)
Life As We Know It: A Collection of Personal Essays from Salon.com (essay, "Love Me, Love My Guns") (2003)
Dog Is My Co-Pilot: Great Writers on the World's Oldest Friendship (essay, "Brave and Noble Is the Preschool Dog") (2003)
Some of My Best Friends: Writers on Interracial Friendships (essay, "Cartilage") (2004)
Little Women (afterword) (2004)
Because I Said So: 33 Mothers Write About Children, Sex, Men, Aging, Faith, Race, and Themselves  (essay, "The Belly Unbuttoned") (2005)
I Married My Mother-in-law And Other Tales of In-laws We Can't Live With - And Can't Live Without (essay, "A Family You Can't Divorce") (2006)
Inlandia:  A Literary Journey Through California's Inland Empire (introduction) (2006)
Bad Girls: 26 Writers Misbehave (essay, "Reckless") (July 2007)
The Show I'll Never Forget: 50 Writers Relive Their Most Memorable Concertgoing Experience (essay, "The Funk Festival at Los Angeles Coliseum, Los Angeles, May 26, 1979") (2007)

References

External links
 
Essays by Susan Straight at Salon
Creative Writing & Writing for the Performing Arts Master's degree program at UC-Riverside 
Straight's Introduction to the Inlandia anthology 
The UMass MFA Program for Poets & Writers 
 
Karen Grigsby Bates, "Author Susan Straight Takes Us 'In The Country Of Women'", NPR, January 29, 2020.

1960 births
Living people
20th-century American novelists
21st-century American novelists
American women novelists
Edgar Award winners
Writers from Riverside, California
University of California, Riverside faculty
University of Massachusetts Amherst MFA Program for Poets & Writers alumni
Riverside City College alumni
20th-century American women writers
21st-century American women writers